Lutter am Barenberge is a market town (Flecken) and a former municipality in the Goslar district of Lower Saxony, Germany. Since 1 November 2021, it is part of the town Langelsheim, of which it is an Ortschaft. It was the administrative seat of the former Samtgemeinde ("collective municipality") Lutter am Barenberge

Geography 
It is situated between the Harz mountain range in the south and the Hainberg hills in the north, approx. 13 km (8 mi) northwest of Goslar. The municipal area comprises the localities of Nauen and Ostlutter.

History 
Lutter, named after a nearby creek, was founded by Emperor Otto I in 956 as a part of the Gandersheim Abbey estates within the Duchy of Saxony. A water castle was first mentioned in 1259, leased by the Bishops of Hildesheim to local nobles. In various times, it was claimed by the Dukes of Brunswick-Lüneburg, but re-acquired by the Hildesheim bishops in 1323. Thereupon the denotation Bischofslutter appeared in order to differ it from nearby Königslutter. The name Lutter am Barenberge (i.e. the Harz mountains) is documented since the 14th century.

In the fierce Hildesheim Diocesan Feud of 1523, Lutter was again conquered by Duke Henry V of Brunswick and the Hildesheim prince-bishop John IV of Saxe-Lauenburg could only retain the locality of Ostlutter. During the Thirty Years' War, the Danish troops under King Christian IV retired to Lutter Castle, where they were defeated by Imperial and Catholic forces led by Count Tilly in the 1626 Battle of Lutter, a rout that changed the course of the Thirty Years' War.

According to the Final Act of the Vienna Congress, the former Hildesheim estates of Ostlutter in 1815 passed to the Kingdom of Hanover (Prussian Province of Hanover from 1866), while Lutter proper remained with the Duchy of Brunswick. Both parts were not re-united until an administrative reform of 1941.

Demographics 
As of 30 June 2020 there were 2,296 inhabitants in the municipality Lutter am Barenberge, of which 1,583 in Lutter am Barenberge proper, 313 in Nauen and 400 in Ostlutter.

References

External links 

 
 Notgeld (emergency banknotes) for the town of Lutter am Baranberge depicting King Christian IV's retreat after the Battle of Lutter. http://webgerman.com/Notgeld/Directory/L/Lutter.htm

Goslar (district)
Duchy of Brunswick